1,4-Butanediol diglycidyl ether (B14DODGE) is an organic chemical in the glycidyl ether family. It is aliphatic and a colorless liquid. It has two epoxide (oxirane) groups per molecule. Its main use is in modifying epoxy resins especially viscosity reduction.

It is REACH registered. The IUPAC name is 2-[4-(oxiran-2-ylmethoxy)butoxymethyl]oxirane.

Synthesis
1,4-Butanediol and epichlorohydrin are reacted in the presence of a Lewis acid as catalyst to form a halohydrin: each hydroxyl group of the diol reacts with an epoxide on epichlorohydrin. This process is followed by washing with sodium hydroxide to re-form the epoxide rings in dehydrochlorination reaction. One of the quality control tests would involve measuring the Epoxy value by determination of the epoxy equivalent weight.

Uses
A key use is modifying the viscosity and properties of epoxy resins which may then be formulated into CASE applications: Coatings,  Adhesives, Sealants, Elastomers, composite materials, fillers, putties, plasters, modelling clay and semiconductors. It also has a number of medical applications. The molecule is also used to synthesize other molecules. As an Epoxy modifier it is classed as an epoxy reactive diluent.The use of the diluent does effect mechanical properties and microstructure of epoxy resins.

Toxicity
The toxicity is fairly well known and understood and is rated as a severe skin and eye irritant. Contact dermatitis is also possible.

References

Further reading

External websites
 Hexion difunctional epoxy diluents
 Denacol epoxy diluent range
 Cargill Reactive diluents

Glycidyl ethers
Reactive diluents